Yuri Anatolyevich Petrov (born 18 July 1974 ) is a Russian former footballer who spent most of his professional career in the Netherlands.

Club career
He played one game in the UEFA Cup 1993–94 for FC Lokomotiv Moscow. He was fired by FC Twente in 1998 because of alcohol abuse. He later played for clubs in Russia and Ukraine and returned to Holland to play for FC Volendam in 2006.

International career
He represented Russia at the 1993 FIFA World Youth Championship.

Personal life
Petrov was married to Tanya Kazakova and the couple have two children. They divorced because of him developing a severe drinking problem.

Honours
 Russian Premier League bronze: 1994.

References

External links
 

1974 births
Living people
Sportspeople from Kryvyi Rih
Association football forwards
Russian footballers
Russia youth international footballers
Russia under-21 international footballers
FC Dnipro players
FC Spartak Moscow players
FC Lokomotiv Moscow players
MFC Mykolaiv players
RKC Waalwijk players
FC Twente players
ADO Den Haag players
FC Spartak Vladikavkaz players
FC Volyn Lutsk players
FC SKA-Khabarovsk players
FC Metalist Kharkiv players
FC Volendam players
ASWH players
Haaglandia players
Russian Premier League players
Ukrainian Premier League players
Eredivisie players
Eerste Divisie players
Russian expatriate footballers
Expatriate footballers in Ukraine
Expatriate footballers in the Netherlands